Justice Culver may refer to:

Barbara Culver (1926–2016), associate justice of the Texas Supreme Court
Frank P. Culver Jr., associate justice of the Texas Supreme Court